Long Hưng is a commune located in Biên Hòa city of Đồng Nai province, Vietnam. It has an area of around 11.7km2 and the population in 2017 was 6,874.

It is the only commune of Bien Hoa city.

References

Bien Hoa